Articles on Lehigh Line include:

 Lehigh Valley Railroad, a former railroad that merged into Conrail 
 Lehigh Valley Railway, a former short line railroad owned by the Lehigh Valley Railroad
 Lehigh Line (Norfolk Southern) (original Lehigh Line, formerly known as Lehigh Valley Mainline), the Lehigh Valley Railroad's main line, now owned by Norfolk Southern Railway 
 Lehigh Line (Conrail), a rail line owned by Conrail Shared Assets Operations, was once part of the original Lehigh Line 
 Lehigh Line Connection, a railroad connection near Newark, New Jersey